The 10th constituency of Budapest is one of the single member constituencies of the National Assembly, the national legislature of Hungary. The constituency standard abbreviation: Budapest 10. OEVK.

Since 2018, it has been represented by Tímea Szabó of the MSZP-Dialogue party alliance.

Geography
The 10th constituency is located in northern part of Buda (Óbuda).

The constituency borders with 3rd constituency of Pest County to the north, 11th constituency to the east, 7th constituency to the southeast, 4th constituency to the south and west.

List of districts
The constituency includes the following municipalities:

 District III.: Eastern part of the district.

History
The 10th constituency of Budapest was created in 2011 and contained of the pre-2011 abolished constituencies of the part of 3rd and 4th constituency of the capital. Its borders have not changed since its creation.

Members
The constituency was first represented by László Kiss of MSZP (with Unity support) from 2014 to 2018. Tímea Szabó of the Dialogue was elected in 2018.

Election result

2022 election

2018 election

2014 election

Notes

References

Budapest 10th